In mathematics, the Baily–Borel compactification is a compactification of a quotient of a Hermitian symmetric space by an arithmetic group, introduced by  .

Example
If C is the quotient of the upper half plane by a congruence subgroup of SL2(Z), then the Baily–Borel compactification of C is formed by adding a finite number of cusps to it.

See also
L² cohomology

References

Algebraic geometry
Compactification (mathematics)